Giey-sur-Aujon (literally Giey on Aujon) is a commune in the Haute-Marne department in north-eastern France.

Geography
The Aujon flows northwestward through the middle of the commune; the village lies on its left bank.

See also
Communes of the Haute-Marne department

References

Gieysuraujon